California Valley, may mean:

A valley:
 California Valley (Inyo County) in Inyo County, California

A populated place:
 California Valley, California